"Champion" is a song by Bethel Music and Dante Bowe, which was released as the fourth single from Bethel Music's twelfth live album, Revival's in the Air (2020), on July 17, 2020. The song was written by Brandon Lake, Dante Bowe, Jonathan Jay, Steffany Gretzinger, and Tony Brown. Chuck Butler handled the production of the single.

Background
On May 15, 2020, Bethel Music launched the pre-order of Revival's in the Air with the release of "Champion" as the first promotional single, along with the song's accompanying live music video. Dante Bowe shared the story behind of the song, saying: 
The studio-recorded version of "Champion" was released in digital format on July 17, 2020. The song then impacted Christian radio in the United States on August 7, 2020.

Composition

Commercial performance
"Champion" debuted at number 32 on the US Hot Christian Songs chart. The song spent seven weeks on the chart.

Music videos
Bethel Music released the live music video of "Champion" with Dante Bowe leading the song at Bethel Church through their YouTube channel on May 15, 2020. On July 20, 2020, the alternate music video of the song was published by Bethel Music on their YouTube channel.

Charts

Release history

Maverick City Music and Upperroom version

On November 20, 2020, Maverick City Music and Upperroom released their own rendition of "Champion" featuring Brandon Lake and Maryanne J. George, on their collaborative extended play, You Hold It All Together (2020).

Commercial performance
Maverick City Music and Upperroom's version of "Champion" debuted at number 48 on the US Hot Christian Songs chart. The song peaked at No. 42 and spent a total of three weeks on the Hot Christian Songs chart. On the Hot Gospel Songs chart, the song debuted at No. 20, and spent a total of five weeks on the chart.

Music video
Tribl released the official music video of "Champion" with Brandon Lake and Maryanne J. George leading the song at Upperroom in Dallas, Texas, through their YouTube channel on December 18, 2020.

Charts

References

External links
  on PraiseCharts

2020 singles
2020 songs
Bethel Music songs
Dante Bowe songs
Maverick City Music songs
Brandon Lake songs
Songs written by Dante Bowe
Songs written by Brandon Lake